12 Vulpeculae is a star in the northern constellation of Vulpecula, located approximately 630 light years away based on parallax. It has the variable star designation V395 Vul; 12 Vulpeculae is the Flamsteed designation. This object is visible to the naked eye as a faint, blue-white hued star with a baseline apparent visual magnitude of 4.928. It is moving closer to the Earth with a heliocentric radial velocity of -25 km/s.

This is a variable Be star with a stellar classification of B2.5V; its brightness ranges from magnitude 4.78 down to 4.97. As is true with other Be stars, it has a high rate of rotation with a projected rotational velocity of 195 km/s. The star has 6.8 times the mass of the Sun and is radiating 963 times the Sun's luminosity from its photosphere at an effective temperature of 18,859 K.

References

B-type main-sequence stars
Be stars
Vulpecula
Durchmusterung objects
Vulpeculae, 12
187811
097679
7565